Rollhockey Bundesliga is the biggest Roller Hockey Clubs Championship in Germany.

List of winners
A German championship was organised from 1920 onwards. From 1967 onwards the Roller Hockey Bundesliga was established:

Number of Championships by team

External links

German websites
German federation website
 Rh-news-German roller hockey news website

International
 Roller Hockey links worldwide
rink-hockey-news - World Roller Hockey

Sports leagues in Germany
Roller hockey in Germany
Germany